The Juno Awards of 2017, honouring Canadian music achievements, were presented in Ottawa, Ontario the weekend of 1–2 April 2017. The ceremonies were held at the Canadian Tire Centre in Kanata and televised on CTV with Bryan Adams and Russell Peters as co-hosts. The duo replaced Michael Bublé, who was originally scheduled to host the show.

Events
Various events associated with the awards are held in Ottawa from 27 March until the primary awards ceremony at the Canadian Tire Centre on 2 April. The Last Juno Award Broadcast on CTV.

The Juno Cup charity hockey game was played at TD Place Arena on 31 March. The NHL former players team beat the musicians team with a score of 13-12.

A Songwriters' Circle event was hosted by Bruce Cockburn on 2 April at the National Arts Centre. Daniel Caesar, Chantal Kreviazuk, Lisa LeBlanc, Colin Linden, Paul Murphy and Donovan Woods performed. CBC Radio broadcast recordings of this event.

Gala dinner
Most award category winners were announced at a private dinner gala 1 April at the Shaw Centre hosted by musician and CBC Radio host Tom Power. The late Leonard Cohen won the Artist of the Year category; his son Adam accepted the award on his behalf at the gala. The Tragically Hip won Rock Album of the Year for their album Man Machine Poem. Secret Path, the solo album by Tragically Hip lead singer Gord Downie, won Junos in two categories: Adult Alternative Album and Recording Package of the Year. Drake did not win any of his several nominations at the gala and The Weeknd won in only the R&B/Soul Recording category for his Starboy album.

Primary ceremony
The televised award ceremony on 2 April was hosted by Bryan Adams and Russell Peters. Performers included Arkells, Alessia Cara, Billy Talent, Dallas Smith, July Talk, Ruth B, Sarah McLachlan, Shawn Mendes, The Strumbellas, A Tribe Called Red.

Changes to host 
Michael Bublé was originally scheduled to host the awards, but had cancelled public appearances due to his son's cancer diagnosis.

It was announced on 1 November 2016 that the singer would return to host of the 2017 ceremony after playing emcee in 2013. Three days later, on 3 November, Bublé made public that he would be suspending professional activities to focus on his son's treatment. At that time it was uncertain whether he would still host the Junos or its British counterpart, the Brits.

Bell Media president Randy Lennox said in an interview with The Canadian Press that initial discussions with Russell Peters began in early November when the comedian offered to take the hosting gig if Bublé needed someone else to step in. Shortly after Bublé opted to forgo the Brit Awards hosting plans, singer Adams also began talking with Juno organizers about taking a role in the Canadian broadcast.

On 9 March 2017, the Juno Awards announced that Bublé would be replaced by Adams and Peters.

Indigenous introduction 
The telecast began with a sketch introducing the co-hosts prior to taking the stage. Prime Minister Justin Trudeau appeared in this segment, phoning Adams to request a performance of  "Summer of '69".

Buffy Sainte-Marie appeared on stage at the Canadian Tire to declare that the event was held on traditional Algonquin territory. She then introduced A Tribe Called Red who performed music from their album We are the Halluci Nation accompanied by throat singer Tanya Tagaq.

Leonard Cohen tribute
Justin Trudeau and his wife Sophie Grégoire Trudeau paid tribute to musician Leonard Cohen who died in November 2016. Feist then sang Cohen's song "Hey, That’s No Way to Say Goodbye", accompanied only by her acoustic guitar and singers Ariel Engle and Daniela Gesundheit of Hydra.  Cohen's album You Want it Darker was later awarded a Juno for Album of the Year. He won the Artist of the Year category during the previous night's gala.

McLachlan joins Hall of Fame
Sarah McLachlan was this year's inductee to the Canadian Music Hall of Fame. A video montage featuring of her career began with a tribute from former American president Bill Clinton. Sheryl Crow, Josh Groban, Diana Krall, James Taylor and Tegan and Sara also provided statements in honour of McLachlan's career.

McLachlan took the stage to make an acceptance speech which noted the presence and importance of diversity, politeness and the arts in Canadian society, declaring that "[w]e Canadians, we're far from perfect, but we have a lot to offer the world and we have to continue to set the bar high." while expressing gratitude to those who supported her career.

Peters controversy
During the ceremony broadcast, co-host Russell Peters spotted some young women in the audience and remarked "Look at all the young girls. This is a felony waiting to happen." Furthermore, when announcing that Minister of Canadian Heritage Mélanie Joly was co-presenting the Breakthrough Artist of the Year Award with musician Coleman Hell, Russell added  "I don't know why, but she's hot, so who cares?" The following day, Joly declared that Peters' comments were not appropriate, indicating a need to ensure "that all our role models are supporting the importance of gender parity." Allan Reid, president of CARAS and the Juno Awards, issued an apology and distanced the Juno Awards organization from Peters' statements.

Nominees and winners
Category nominees were announced on 7 February 2017.

Buffy Sainte-Marie is the 2017 recipient of the Allan Waters Humanitarian Award. Randy Lennox is the year's recipient of the Walt Grealis Special Achievement Award. Sarah McLachlan is the 2017 Canadian Music Hall of Fame inductee.

The category for Aboriginal Album of the Year was renamed to Indigenous Music Album of the Year as of the 2017 awards. The first 34 awards were announced on 1 April 2017.

People

Albums

Songs and recordings

Other

References

2017 music awards
2017
Music festivals in Ottawa
Culture of Ottawa
2017 in Canadian music
April 2017 events in Canada
2017 in Ontario
2010s in Ottawa